Arthur Buckner "Buck" Harris (November 16, 1876 – ?) was a college football player and physician. He was once an eye, ear, nose and throat specialist in Birmingham, Alabama.

Early years
Harris born on November 16, 1876 in Seguin, Texas to the Rev. Buckner Harris. He grew up in San Antonio, Texas.

University of Virginia
Harris was a prominent guard for the Virginia Cavaliers of the University of Virginia. At Virginia he was a member of the Delta Tau Delta fraternity.

1900
Harris played for the 1900 team which had a claim to a Southern championship and defeated Sewanee to give the school its first loss since 1897.

1901
He was selected All-Southern in 1901.

Personal life
He married Miss Caroline B. Lyons on December 23, 1902. At the time of his marriage he was head surgeon of the Cannelton coal mines in West Virginia.

References

American football guards
All-Southern college football players
Virginia Cavaliers football players
Year of birth unknown
Year of death unknown
Players of American football from San Antonio
1876 births
Physicians from Texas